DoubleDave's Pizzaworks is a chain of pizza restaurants based in Austin, Texas. The first restaurant was founded by David Davydd Miller in College Station, TX in 1984. Charles M. Thorp, Jr. is the CEO. In addition to several varieties of pizza the chain is famous for its 'Peproni Rolls'.

 there were about 40 locations in Texas and two locations in Oklahoma. The first Oklahoma location opened in 2007 in Norman as a part of the HeyDay Entertainment center and the second in 2017 in Oklahoma City.

See also
 List of companies based in Austin, Texas
 List of pizza chains of the United States

References

External links
 DoubleDave's Pizzaworks

1984 establishments in Texas
Pizza franchises
Regional restaurant chains in the United States
Companies based in Austin, Texas
Restaurants established in 1984